Derrick Willies (born October 17, 1994) is an American football wide receiver who is currently a free agent. He played college football at Texas Tech and played professionally for the Cleveland Browns of the National Football League (NFL).

Early years
Willies attended and played high school football and ran track at Burlington High School in Iowa before transferring Rock Island High School during his junior year and was named all-state at both schools. In track, Willies won the Illinois Class 3A state championship in the 110-meter hurdles.

College career
Willies began his college career at the University of Iowa. After sitting out his first year, Willies had 4 catches for 71 yards and a touchdown as a redshirt freshman before leaving the team in late October. Willies transferred to Trinity Valley Community College where he was a first-team Junior College Athletic Association All-American and subsequently transferred to Texas Tech. Willies caught 36 passes for 592 yards and five touchdowns over two seasons with the Red Raiders.

Professional career

Cleveland Browns
Willies was signed by the Cleveland Browns as an undrafted free agent on May 4, 2018. Willies made the Browns 53-man roster and made his NFL debut on September 9, 2018 during the team's season opener against the Pittsburgh Steelers. On October 7 against the Baltimore Ravens, Willies caught his first career NFL pass, a 13-yard reception, and had a pivotal 39-yard reception in overtime to set up the Browns' game-winning field goal. After fracturing his collarbone during practice on October 12, Willies was placed on injured reserve on October 13, 2018.

On August 31, 2019, Willies was waived by the Browns and was signed to the practice squad the next day. His practice squad contract with the team expired on January 6, 2020, and he was not invited to training camp by any team.

Willies was re-signed to the Browns' practice squad on November 17, 2020. He was elevated to the active roster on December 26 for the team's week 16 game against the New York Jets, and reverted to the practice squad after the game.

Willies was signed to a reserve/futures contract by the Browns on January 18, 2021. The Browns placed Willies on the reserve/retired list on July 30, 2021. He was waived from the reserve/retired list on February 17, 2022.

Tampa Bay Bandits
Willies was selected in the 14th round of the 2022 USFL Draft by the Tampa Bay Bandits. He was transferred to the team's inactive roster on April 22, 2022. He was moved to the inactive roster again on May 11. He was moved back to the active roster on May 20.

NFL statistics

References

External links

Cleveland Browns bio
Trinity Valley Community College Cardinals bio
Texas Tech Red Raiders bio

1994 births
Living people
American football wide receivers
Cleveland Browns players
Iowa Hawkeyes football players
Players of American football from California
Sportspeople from Rock Island, Illinois
Sportspeople from San Bernardino, California
Texas Tech Red Raiders football players
Trinity Valley Cardinals football players
Tampa Bay Bandits (2022) players